"Point of No Return" was an American television play broadcast on February 20, 1958, as part of the second season of the CBS television series Playhouse 90. Franklin Schaffner directed. Charlton Heston and Hope Lange starred.

Plot
Financier Charles Gray, under consideration for a promotion, is sent to his home town in New England, visits his childhood sweetheart, and questions his life and marriage.

Cast
The following performers received screen credit for their performances:

 Charlton Heston - Charles Gray
 Hope Lange - Jessica Lovell
 Edward Andrews - Roger Blakesley
 John Williams - Mr. Lovell
 Nancy Gray - Katharine Bard
 Ainslie Pryor - Jackie Mason

Production
Franklin Schaffner directed. Frank D. Gilroy wrote the teleplay as an adaptation of the novel by John P. Marquand. It was originally broadcast on February 20, 1958. It was part of the second season of Playhouse 90, an anthology television series that was voted "the greatest television series of all time" in a 1970 poll of television editors.

References

1958 television plays
1958 American television episodes
Playhouse 90 (season 2) episodes